Geoffrey Arnott may refer to:
Geoffrey H. Arnott (1902–1986), Australian chairman of Arnott's Biscuits Holdings
W. Geoffrey Arnott (1930–2010), British classicist